Metachanda fulgidella is a moth species in the oecophorine tribe, Metachandini. It was described by Henry Legrand in 1965.

References

Oecophorinae
Moths described in 1965